This is a list of members of the Western Australian Legislative Assembly between the 1905 elections and the 1908 elections, together known as the Sixth Parliament.

Notes
 James Price (Fremantle) and Norbert Keenan (Kalgoorlie) were appointed by the Premier, Newton Moore, as Minister for Works and Attorney-General respectively on 7 May 1906. Both were therefore required to resign and contest ministerial by-elections on 25 May 1906, at which both were returned.
 Following the 1905 state election, Ministerial member William Eddy, who had won the seat of Coolgardie by 23 votes against Labor's Charles McDowall in a three-candidate contest, faced a by-election after a petition was lodged against his return. He resigned on 27 April 1906, and was returned at the by-election on 9 July 1906 with a majority of 100 against McDowall.
 The member for South Fremantle, Arthur Diamond, died on 22 June 1906. Arthur Davies won the resulting by-election on 16 July 1906.
 Sir Cornthwaite Rason, the Ministerialist member for Guildford and former Premier, resigned on 27 June 1906 to take up the position of Agent-General for Western Australia in London. At the resulting by-election on 16 July 1906, Labor candidate William Johnson won the seat.
 On 27 June 1906, the member for Pilbara, James Isdell, resigned his seat. At the resulting by-election on 23 July 1906, Labor candidate Henry Underwood won the seat.
 Following the 1905 state election, Ministerial member Joseph Holmes, who had won the seat of East Fremantle by 20 votes (1.0%) against Labor's William Angwin, faced a by-election after a petition was upheld against his return on 24 October 1906. He was defeated by Angwin at the by-election on 13 November 1906, who won 71.37% of the vote.
 Following the 1905 state election, Ministerial member Henry Carson, who had won the seat of Geraldton by 26 votes (Black (1997) notes some sources say 12 votes) against Labor's Thomas Brown, faced a by-election after a petition was upheld against his return on 26 October 1906. He was defeated by Brown at the by-election on 21 November 1906 by 19 votes.
 On 2 November 1906, the Labor member for Mount Leonora, Patrick Lynch, resigned his seat. At the resulting by-election on 13 November 1906, Labor member Julian Stuart was returned unopposed.
 On 13 August 1907, the member for West Perth, Frederick Illingworth, resigned his seat. At the resulting by-election on 2 September 1907, National Political League candidate Thomas Draper won the seat, and joined the Ministerial group in the Legislative Assembly.
 Henry Daglish, the former Labor Premier and member for Subiaco, resigned from the Labor Party before the 1905 election, and was elected under an "Independent Labor" designation.

Sources
 
 
 Western Australian Government Gazettes for 1905, 1906 and 1907; Indexed under "Electoral".

Members of Western Australian parliaments by term